Yelena Biserova (born 24 March 1962) is a Russian female former track and field hurdler who competed for the Soviet Union in the 100 metres hurdles. She represented her country at the 1983 World Championships in Athletics and the 1982 European Athletics Indoor Championships, finishing sixth at the global event. She was the silver medallist in the sprint hurdles at the 1983 Universiade, behind her compatriot Natalya Petrova.

Biserova set a personal best time of 12.66 seconds for the 100 m hurdles in 1984, which ranked her in the top ten globally for that year.

International competitions

References

External links

Living people
1962 births
Russian female hurdlers
Soviet female hurdlers
World Athletics Championships athletes for the Soviet Union
Universiade medalists in athletics (track and field)
Universiade silver medalists for the Soviet Union
Medalists at the 1983 Summer Universiade